Martin Fischer and Philipp Oswald successfully defended their 2009 title, after win against Alessandro Motti and Simone Vagnozzi 4–6, 6–2, [10–6] in the final.

Seeds

Draw

Draw

References
 Main Draw

Sicilia Classic - Doubles
Sicilia Classic